"Rock and Roll" is the debut single by English glam rock singer Gary Glitter that was released in 1972, from his debut studio album Glitter. Co-written by Glitter and Mike Leander, the song is in two parts: Part 1 is a vocal track reflecting on the history of the genre, and Part 2 is a mostly instrumental piece. Both parts peaked at number two on the UK Singles Chart. In concert, Glitter merged both into one performance.

"Rock and Roll" is Glitter's only top ten single in the United States. It was also in North America that the "Part 2" became popularly associated with sports, as a number of professional teams began to play the song during games to invigorate the audience. Since Glitter's convictions for child sex offences, the song's continued use has been controversial.

In the UK, "Rock and Roll" was one of over 25 hit singles for Glitter. In the US, the instrumental version (Part 2) attracted most of the attention; it hit No. 7 on the Billboard Hot 100. The running time of the US mono 45, which is mixed different from the LP, is 3:10 whilst it is 2:58 on the US LP. In France, "Part 1" was the successful side, peaking at number one.

History and usage

Sports
In North America, "Part 2" became popularly associated with sports, as a number of professional teams adopted the song for use during games, primarily to signify scores and victories, or to otherwise invigorate the crowd. It is often referred to as "The 'Hey' Song," as the only intelligible word in Part 2 is the exclamation of "Hey," punctuating the end of several instrumental phrases and repeated three times at the song's chorus. It was played first in a sport setting in 1974 at games for the Kalamazoo Wings of the high-minor International Hockey League by Kevin O'Brien, the team's public relations and marketing director. When he went to work for the NHL's Colorado Rockies in 1976, he brought the song with him. After the Rockies moved to New Jersey as the New Jersey Devils in 1982, the Denver Nuggets and Denver Broncos picked up the tradition and were the first NBA and NFL teams to play the song during games. At sporting events, fans often insert their own "Hey," or sometimes other chanted syllables (such as "you suck!"—which controversially led to a decision by the Devils to switch to a song by New Jersey-native Bon Jovi instead).

In 1999, Glitter was convicted of downloading child pornography in England, and in 2006 of child sexual abuse charges in Vietnam. After the second conviction was upheld in court, the NFL asked teams to stop playing the song. The NFL allowed a cover version of the song by the Tube Tops 2000 to be played, but in 2012, the NFL instructed teams to "avoid" the song following negative reaction from British media to the New England Patriots' use of the song. In 2014, Billboard reported that the song was slowly falling out of favour due to both the controversies, and teams electing to replace it with newer songs.

Films and television
"Rock and Roll Part 2" was used for Sudden Death, both in a trailer and the actual film. In the latter, the song can be heard from the Civic Arena's audio system whenever the Pittsburgh Penguins score a goal, much like what happened in real games at the time.

The song was used in Happy Gilmore with Happy and Shooter McGavin playing a golf matchup in the Tour Championship to purchase the house Happy's grandma lived in.

In The Simpsons episode 'A Fish Called Selma', first broadcast in 1996, Homer sings the chorus to the song in his head.

In the King of the Hill episode 'Nine Pretty Darn Angry Men', the song is played while Luanne and Bobby are at the ice skating rink in the Six Malls Over Texas, with Luanne mentioning the song reminding her of her deceased boyfriend Buckley.

The song was also in a scene of the movie Meet the Fockers, starring Ben Stiller and Robert de Niro. In the scene, the three main male characters play a game of football.

In episode 5 of season 3 of the American version of the Office the character Michael Scott (Steve Carell) listens and dances to the song in his office while having a sugar high after consuming a candy-laden soft pretzel.

In 2019, "Rock and Roll Part 2" appeared in Todd Phillips' film Joker as Arthur Fleck dances down a staircase, generating public controversy. Some sources indicated that Glitter, as co-writer of the song, would receive a lump sum and royalties for its use. According to the Los Angeles Times, Glitter does not receive payment when the song is used as he has sold the rights, and the US rights to the song are now owned by Universal Music Publishing Group.

Games
"Rock and Roll Part 2" was used in a commercial for Donkey Kong Land 2 in 1996 with some chimpanzees dancing to the song in the jungle.

Chart performance

Cover versions
Part 2 was sampled in the Timelords' hit "Doctorin' the Tardis".

Part 2 is used as the tune for "Boris Johnson Is Still a Fucking Cunt" by the Kunts.

References

External links

1972 songs
1972 debut singles
Sporting songs
Colorado Rockies (NHL)
Denver Nuggets
Gary Glitter songs
Rock instrumentals
Songs about rock music
Songs written by Mike Leander
Song recordings produced by Mike Leander
Songs written by Gary Glitter
Bell Records singles
Songs involved in royalties controversies